Muhammet Emin Akbaşoğlu (born 6 October 1968, Istanbul, Turkey) is aTurkish politician, lawyer and member of Turkish Parliament, and a member of Justice and Development party in Turkey Parliamentary Group Deputy chairman

Biography 
Akbaşoğlu was born in 1968 in Gazi osmanpaşa, Istanbul. He studied at Imam Hatip High School and graduated from Istanbul University's Faculty of Law.

Akbaşoğlu, who speaks Arabic and English, is married with two children.

References 

Living people
1968 births
Turkish political people
Istanbul University Faculty of Law alumni
Politicians from Istanbul